Gilbert Belin (22 October 1927 – 14 February 2020) was a French politician and sculptor.

Biography
Belin enrolled in the École supérieure d'art de Clermont Métropole in 1940, at the time when it was headed by Louis Dussour, and its faculty included Valentin Vigneron and Alfred Thesonnier. He joined the French Ministry of National Education in 1949 and became a professor of plastic art in Brassac-les-Mines and Saint-Éloy-les-Mines. After Gustave Gournier's departure from the École supérieure d'art de Clermont Métropole, Belin gave lectures there in the 1980s.

Belin was a member of the Société des Artistes d'Auvergne while leading art workshops and participating in local exhibitions with the organization.

Belin began his political career in the 1970s, with his election into the Canton of Jumeaux. He would be re-elected in every attempt until his retirement from politics in 2001. He also served five terms as mayor of Brassac-les-Mines from 1971 to 2001. He served as a Senator for Puy-de-Dôme from 1974 until 1983, when he chose not to run for re-election as Michel Charasse took over. However, Belin returned to Luxembourg Palace in 1988 and was nominated as Minister of State, and appointed to the Ministry of the Economy and Finance in the government of Michel Rocard. He remained in the Senate until 1992, and stayed in power in Puy-de-Dôme and Brassac-les-Mines until 2001.

Gilbert Belin died on 14 February 2020 at the age of 92.

Honors
Officer of the Legion of Honour (1993), Knight in 1984

Publications
Brassac & ses environs (1992)

References

1927 births
2020 deaths
20th-century French politicians
Socialist Party (France) politicians
Mayors of places in Auvergne-Rhône-Alpes